"Mama Ain't Proud" is a song by Australian singer Guy Sebastian, released digitally in Australia on 20 October 2014. It debuted at number 17 on the ARIA Singles Chart. It is the third single from his album Madness and was produced by Twice as Nice, Shuko & Freedo. "Mama Ain't Proud" was certified gold by the Australian Recording Industry Association for shipments exceeding 35,000 copies.

Release and promotion
Sebastian performed the song live on The X Factor Australia grand final show on October 20 and on Sunrise on October 27.

The video was shot in Atlanta on October 10. The Tagline "mama ain't proud" was penned by Guy Sebastian after a heated argument with his mother about his lack of Christianity.

Charts

Weekly charts

Year-end chart

Certifications

References

2014 singles
2014 songs
Guy Sebastian songs
Sony Music Australia singles
Songs written by 2 Chainz
Songs written by Freedo (producer)